Kevin G. Doell (born July 15, 1979) is a Canadian former professional ice hockey forward. He played in the National Hockey League (NHL) with the Atlanta Thrashers.

Playing career
Doell grew up in Saskatoon playing his last year of minor hockey for the AAA Saskatoon Blazers Midgets of the SMHL. He then moved onto play for the Melfort Mustangs Jr.A. team of the SJHL.

Undrafted, Doell played for the University of Denver Pioneers, where he was an All-WCHA selection in 2003. After completing his collegiate career Doell was invited to the Atlanta Thrashers training camp on September 12, 2003. Reassigned from the Thrashers training camp to AHL affiliate, the Chicago Wolves, Doell signed a one-year contract at the start of the 2003–04 season.

After his first professional season within Atlanta's affiliate teams, Doell was selected in the ECHL All-Rookie Team and named the ECHL's Rookie of the year after posting 74 points in 63 games with the Gwinnett Gladiators. He was then signed by the Thrashers to his first NHL contract on June 30, 2004. Although primarily an AHL player, Doell briefly played in the National Hockey League, playing his first NHL game for the Atlanta Thrashers on January 4, 2008 against the Carolina Hurricanes. He played eight games for the Thrashers before returning to the AHL Chicago Wolves.

In 2008–09, Doell played for the Swedish team Leksands IF in the second tier HockeyAllsvenskan League. Finishing an impressive fourth on the team with 49 points Kevin returned to play again with the Chicago Wolves in the AHL for the 2009–10 season.

After spending the 2010–11 season abroad in Finland with Tappara of the SM-liiga, Doell signed a one-year contract to return for his third stint with the Chicago Wolves on June 21, 2011. Following the 2011–12 season with the Wolves, Doell returned to Europe for a further two seasons before closing out his professional career.

Career statistics

Awards and honors

References

External links

1979 births
Living people
Atlanta Thrashers players
Canadian ice hockey centres
Chicago Wolves players
SG Cortina players
Denver Pioneers men's ice hockey players
Gwinnett Gladiators players
EC KAC players
Leksands IF players
Ice hockey people from Saskatchewan
Sportspeople from Saskatoon
Tappara players
Undrafted National Hockey League players
VIK Västerås HK players
Canadian expatriate ice hockey players in Austria
Canadian expatriate ice hockey players in Italy
Canadian expatriate ice hockey players in Finland
Canadian expatriate ice hockey players in Sweden